Sydney G. Gumpertz (October 24, 1879 - February 16, 1971) was a United States Army First Sergeant and  recipient to the highest military decoration for valor in combat — the Medal of Honor — during World War I.

Awards
Medal of Honor
World War I Victory Medal
Médaille militaire (France)
Croix de Guerre with palm (France)

Medal of Honor Citation

Rank and organization: First Sergeant, United States Army, Company E, 132d Infantry, 33d Division.
Place and date: In the Bois-de-Forges, France, September 29, 1918.
Entered service at: Chicago, Illinois.
Born: October 24, 1879, San Raphael, California.
General Orders No.: 16, War Department, 1919.
Residence at enlistment: 57 East Van Buren Street, Chicago, Illinois.

Citation:

When the advancing line was held up by machinegun fire, 1st Sgt. Gumpertz left the platoon of which he was in command and started with 2 other soldiers through a heavy barrage toward the machinegun nest. His 2 companions soon became casualties from bursting shells, but 1st Sgt. Gumpertz continued on alone in the face of direct fire from the machinegun, jumped into the nest and silenced the gun, capturing 9 of the crew.

See also

List of Medal of Honor recipients
List of Jewish Medal of Honor recipients
List of Medal of Honor recipients for World War I

References

1879 births
1971 deaths
United States Army Medal of Honor recipients
United States Army soldiers
People from Chicago
United States Army personnel of World War I
Burials at Long Island National Cemetery
Jewish Medal of Honor recipients
World War I recipients of the Medal of Honor
Military personnel from California